Benjamin Foord (21 January 1913 – 29 September 1942) was a South African  professional mixed class boxer of the 1930s and 1940s, who won the South African heavyweight title, British Boxing Board of Control (BBBoFC) British heavyweight title (though he was South African), and British Empire heavyweight title, his professional fighting weight varied from , i.e. Heavyweight. 
Foord died on 29 September 1942, aged 29 years, due to accidental shooting.

Boxing career

Professional

Ben Foord's first professional boxing bout was a knockout victory over Billy Miller at the Town Hall, Durban on 4 June 1932, this was followed by fights including; six wins, one defeat, two draws, then a points victory over, a points defeat by, and a points victory over Clyde Chastain (US) at City Hall, Johannesburg on 4 February 1933, 4 March 1933, and 8 April 1933, Foord then travelled to the United Kingdom, with a points victory over  Vicente Parrile (Argentina) at Royal Albert Hall, London on 29 May 1933, two wins, then a points win over Hans Schoenrath (Germany) at the Royal Albert Hall on 30 October 1933, then two wins, one defeat, Foord then travelled home to South Africa, with a knockout win over Willie Storm for the vacant South African heavyweight title at City Hall, Cape Town on 25 June 1934, one win, then a draw with Presidio Pavesi (Italy) at Wanderers Stadium, Johannesburg on 8 September 1934, Foord then travelled back to the UK, with one win, then a draw with Eddie Wenstob (Canada) at Empire Pool, London on 4 February 1935, one win, one defeat, then a technical knockout victory over Harry Staal (Netherlands) at Granby Halls, Leicester on 25 March 1935, one win, then a technical knockout victory over Harry Staal at Granby Halls, Leicester on 18 May 1935, one win, then a points defeat by Gunnar Bärlund (Finland) at Wembley Stadium, London on 25 June 1935, three wins, then a retirement victory over Claudio Villar (Spain) at Royal Albert Hall, London on 23 September 1935, a technical knockout defeat by Maurice Strickland (New Zealand) at Empire Pool, Wembley on 8 October 1935, a points victory over Larry Gains (Canada) at Granby Halls, Leicester on 25 November 1935, a points defeat by Roy Lazer (USA) at Royal Albert Hall, London on 16 December 1935, a points victory over Roy Lazer (USA) at Granby Halls, Leicester on 20 January 1936, a points victory over Tommy Loughran (USA) at Granby Halls, Leicester on 10 February 1936, a points victory over Larry Gains (Canada) at Granby Halls, Leicester on 9 March 1936, a knockout victory over George Cook (Australia) at White City Stadium, Cardiff on 6 June 1936, one win, then a technical knockout victory over Jack Petersen for the British Boxing Board of Control (BBBoFC) British heavyweight title, and British Empire heavyweight title at Welford Road Stadium, Leicester on 17 August 1936, a points defeat by Walter Neusel (Germany) at Harringay Arena, London on 18 November 1936, a points victory over Tommy Farr defending the British Boxing Board of Control (BBBoFC) British heavyweight title, and British Empire heavyweight title at Harringay Arena, London on 15 March 1937, a technical knockout defeat by Max Baer (USA) at Harringay Arena on 27 May 1937, a points defeat by Max Schmeling (Germany) at Hanseatenhalle, Hamburg, Germany on 30 January 1938, a disqualification defeat by Walter Neusel (Germany) at Hanseatenhalle, Hamburg, Germany on 16 April 1938, two wins, two defeats, Foord then travelled back home to South Africa, with a points win over Buck Everett (USA) at Wembley Ice Rink, Johannesburg on 5 August 1939, one win, then a points defeat by Tommy Bensch for the South African heavyweight title at City Hall, Johannesburg on 20 January 1940, Ben Foord's final professional boxing bout was a points victory over Tom Porter at City Hall (Johannesburg) on 15 June 1940.

Family
Ben Foord's marriage to Phyllis M. ( Souter) was registered during October→December 1937 in Upton-upon-Severn district. He was the brother of the boxer Joe Foord.

Death
After retiring from boxing, Foord joined the army. While at home on leave, he was playing a practical joke by sneaking up on his wife Phyllis with a pistol and pretending to be a desperado. Foord then attempted gunspinning in the American frontier style and accidentally shot himself in the face, killing himself.

References

External links

Image - Ben Foord
Image - Ben Foord
Video - Foord V Neusel Fight 1936
Video - News In A Nutshell 1936
Video - Heavy Weight Championship 1936
Video - British Empire Heavyweight Championship 1936
Video - Baer V Foord - Fight At Haringey Aka Fight… 1937
Video - Heavyweight Championship 1937
Video - Heavyweight Fight - Schmeling Beats Foord… 1938
Article - Ben Foord's Death
Article - Death Said Accident ~ Ben Foord Died Of Bullet Would, Inquest Reveals
Article - When Max Baer Met Ben Foord
Article - Ben Foord ~ by Jeff Ellis

1913 births
1942 deaths
People from Phumelela Local Municipality
White South African people
Cruiserweight boxers
Heavyweight boxers
Light-heavyweight boxers
South African male boxers
Firearm accident victims
Accidental deaths in South Africa
Deaths by firearm in South Africa
South African military personnel of World War II